Tall al-Turmus was a Palestinian Arab village in the Gaza Subdistrict, located on a low hill on the coastal plain of Palestine,  northeast  of Gaza. In 1945, it had a population of 760 and a land area of 11,508 dunams. The village was depopulated during the 1948 Arab-Israeli War.

History
In 1838, Edward Robinson saw Tall al-Turmus located northwest of Tell es-Safi, where he was staying. He further noted that the name meant "Hill of lupines".

In 1863 the French explorer Victor Guérin visited the village, where he found about 100 houses. The villagers had a very deep well, and used animals to draw water from it. An Ottoman village list of about 1870 counted 17 houses and a population of  34, though  the population count included men only.

British Mandate era
In the 1922 census of Palestine conducted by the British Mandate authorities, Tall al-Turnus had a population of 384 inhabitants, all Muslims, increasing in  the 1931 census, to 504 Muslims in 136 houses.

In  the 1945 statistics   the population of Tell et Turmus consisted of  760, all Muslims,  and the total land area was 11,508  dunams, according to an official land and population survey.  Of this, 154 dunams were used  for  citrus and bananas, 
627 for plantations and irrigable land, 10,403 for cereals, while 35 dunams were built-up areas.

The villagers constructed their houses of adobe, building them first on the hill and later expanding the village site eastward and westward. It shared a school with the neighboring village of Qastina, and the school had 160 pupils by the mid-1940s. Agriculture was the mainstay of the economy.

1948, and aftermath
Israeli forces from the First Battalion of the Givati Brigade captured Tall al-Turmus early in Operation An-Far on July 9–10, 1948. During this operation, the inhabitants of the village were among a minority of Palestinian villagers in the area to have been driven from their village towards the Gaza Strip rather than eastwards towards Hebron. Following the war the area was incorporated into the State of Israel and the moshav of Timorim was established the lands of Tall at-Turmus in 1954.

The Israeli settlement of Arugot is close by, but on the land of Qastina, not Tall al-Turmus.

In 1992 the village site was described:"The debris of the houses are strewn over the site and can be found near the clumps of cactuses and the sycamore and eucalyptus trees that grow there."

Archaeology
A salvage excavation at Tell Turmus was conducted by the Israel Antiquities Authority in April 2000 prior to the installation of a water pipe. The remains of a pear-shaped hearth were uncovered, surrounded by pieces of burnt clay that probably used to line the hearth. Inside were two pottery vessels containing burnt animal bones, organic material and a bone implement embedded with stone blades probably used as a sickle. The hearth may date to the Chalcolithic period or Early Bronze Age. Two fragments of a Chalcolithic incised scapula were found at Tall al-Turmus.

References

Bibliography

External links
Welcome To Tall al-Turmus
Tall al-Turmus, Zochrot
Survey of Western Palestine, Map 16:   IAA, Wikimedia commons
Tall al-Turmus from Khalil Sakakini Cultural Center

District of Gaza
Arab villages depopulated during the 1948 Arab–Israeli War